Sumy is a city of regional significance in northeastern Ukraine, and the administrative center of Sumy Oblast. The city is situated on the banks of the Psel River with a population of  making it the 23rd-largest in the country.

The city of Sumy was founded in the 1650s by the Cossacks within the historical region of Sloboda Ukraine.

History 

Sumy was founded by the Cossack Herasym Kondratyev from Stavyshche, Bila Tserkva Regiment on the banks of the Psel River, a tributary of the Dnieper. The exact date of its foundation remains a subject of discussion (in 1652 or 1655). In 1656–58 at the site of the Sumyn early settlement, under the leadership of the Muscovite voivode K. Arsenyev, a city-fort was built that consisted of a fort and a grad (town). 

In the 1670s, Sumy was expanded by adding a fortified posad (craftsmen town), after which it became the biggest fortress of Sloboda Ukraine. From 1658 Sumy was a center of the Sumy Cossack Regiment (military unit and local administrative division). In the 1680s unfortified suburbs began to develop around Sumy.

At the end of the 17th century, Sumy played a role as a collection point for Muscovite troops during the Crimean campaigns of 1687 and 1689. During the Great Northern War, from December 1708 to January 1709, the city was the stavka (headquarters) of the Muscovite Chief of Commander headed by Tsar Peter the Great. Established under the leadership of Prince A. Shakhovskoy, the Commission on streamlining the Sloboda Cossack regiments was located in 1734–43 in Sumy. From its establishment and until the liquidation of Cossackdom in Sloboda Ukraine in 1765, the Cossack officer family of Kondratyevs exercised great influence over the city.

Following the liquidation of the Cossack community in 1765, the Sumy Cossack Regiment as an administrative division was turned into Sumy Province of the newly created Sloboda Ukraine Governorate and the city of Sumy became its center. In 1780 Sumy was turned into a centre of Sumy uyezd. In 1786-89 the city was reformed by removing its city fort vallums. 

After a period of stagnation (1765–1860s), Sumy began to transform into a big industrial and trade center with Paul's Sugar-Refining Factory (est. 1869 by I.Kharytonenko) and the Sumy Engineering Workshops (est. 1896, producing equipment for sugar refineries). With the construction of a railroad Vorozhba – Merefa, the Sumy train station was built in the city in January 1877. Various families of philanthropist industrialists, the most famous of which were the Kharytonenkos, contributed greatly to the development of Sumy.

During the Revolution of 1905, Sumy was one of several areas which became famous throughout Russia for having established an independent peasant republic -the Sumy Republic was established by a peasant union.

During the German occupation of Ukraine during World War II (1941–1944), Sumy sustained heavy damage and was occupied from 10 October 1941 to 2 September 1943. The Germans operated a Nazi prison and a forced labour battalion for Jews in the city. After the war, the destroyed parts of the city were rebuilt.

On 24 February 2022, the first day of the 2022 Russian invasion of Ukraine, Sumy came under attack by Russian forces in the Battle of Sumy.

On 4 April 2022 Governor of Sumy Oblast Dmytro Zhyvytskyi stated that Russian troops no longer occupied any towns or villages in Sumy Oblast and had mostly withdrawn, while Ukrainian troops were working to push out the remaining units. On 8 April, Governor Zhyvytskyi stated that all Russians troops had left Sumy Oblast, while adding that the territory of the region was still unsafe due to rigged explosives and other ammunition left behind by Russian troops.

Geography and climate 
Sumy is located in the northeastern part of Ukraine within the Central Russian Upland and in the historical region of Sloboda Ukraine. It is located on the banks of the Psel River.

Due to its relatively close location, the city's weather is similar to Kharkiv. Sumy's climate is a warm-summer humid continental (Köppen: Dfb) with cold and snowy winters, and hot summers.

Trends show an increase in the fall in precipitation in the coming decades.

Government

Sumy is a city of oblast significance which makes a separate subdivision within the Sumy Oblast. Sumy is also an administrative center of Sumy Raion which surrounds the city.

The city used to be divided into two urban raions (districts), Zarichny and Kovpakovsky, and 13 micro-raions.  Since 2006, the subdivision into urban districts is not in effect.

The city municipality also includes several adjacent villages including Verkhnie Pishchane, Zhyteiske, Zahirske, Kyryiakivshchyna, Pishchane, and Trokhymenkove.

Demographics 

 1897 - 70.53% Ukrainians, 24.1% Russians, 2.6% Jewish, 2.67% others
 1926 - 80.7% Ukrainians, 11.8% Russians, 5.5% Jewish, 2% others
 1959 - 79% Ukrainians, 20% Russians, 1% others

The majority of residents are Christians (Eastern Orthodox, Roman Catholics and Protestant or Evangelical Christians). There is also a Jewish minority.

From the beginning of the twentieth century, Sumy was the center of Roman Catholicism in northeastern Ukraine. The Blessed Virgin Mary Annunciation Church was established in the city in 1901 and consecrated in 1911, but closed by governmental authorities two decades later; the churchhouse was thereafter used for non-religious purposes (e.g., it was used as a gym for Oleksandrivska Gymnasia) until its restoration as a Roman Catholic parish in May 1994, after the disintegration of the Soviet Union. It was reconsecrated in the spring of 1998.

Population 
According to the census held in 1660, the population of Sumy was 2740 people. In 1732 it was 7700 people, in 1773 — 9380 people, in 1850 — 10,256 people, in 1898 — 26,355 people.

During Soviet times the population grew significantly. In 1939 it reached 63.9 thousand people. In 1959 it was 98,015 people, 159 thousand people in 1970, 194 thousand people in 1975, 291,264 people in 1989, and 303.3 thousand people in 1991.

According to the Ukrainian Census of 2001, the population of Sumy was 292,139 people. By January 1, 2013, it had decreased to 269,177 people. On January 1, 2016, the population was 267,633 people.

Economy and infrastructure

Enterprises

 Sumy Engineering Science and Production Association (formerly Frunze factory)
 Sumykhimprom, a major chemical factory
Sumykhimprom chemical plant ammonia leak

Infrastructure
 There is a Sumy Airport in the city. Built in 1978, since 2006 it has been an international airport and received flights from outside Ukraine.
 There are several railway stations in the city, two of which serve passenger trains. All stations are part of the UZ regional branch Southern Railways. Sumy railway station also is the headquarters of one of four territorial subdivisions of the Southern Railways and conducts supervision over some other 45 stations in Sumy, Poltava, and Kharkiv oblasts.
 There are two major routes that cross the city H07 (Kyiv–Yunakivka at Russian border) and H12 (Sumy–Poltava). There are also a few regional routes P44 (Sumy–Hlukhiv), P45 (Sumy–Bohodukhiv), and P61 (Sumy–Baturyn).

Main sights

Landmarks

The city centre is dominated by the large cathedral of the Saviour's Transfiguration. It is a neoclassical structure of the 18th century, extensively repaired and reconstructed in 1858 and in the 1880s when the 56-metre-high bell tower (180 ft) was added. The interior features frescoes by Vladimir Makovsky and Klavdiy Lebedev.
The Resurrection Church (1702), the oldest structure in the town, is still in fair preservation, owing to recent restoration work.
The cathedral of the monastery of St. Pantaleon was erected in 1911 to a design by Aleksey Shchusev and is scored to resemble medieval monuments of Novgorod and Pskov.
A lovely church of Saints Peter and Paul is in the town's cemetery. It was built in 1851 on the donations of Sumy citizens. Beside the church there are tombs of the Kharytonenkos and Sukhanovs with artistic monuments by sculptors – A. Croisy and M. Antokolski.
The Cathedral of Holy Trinity was built in 1902–1914 on the same pattern as the Cathedral of St. Isaac in St. Petersburg. The author of the design was Sumy architect G. Sholts. It was built at the expense of Pavlo Kharitonenko, the local manufacturer and Maecenas who fulfilled his father's last will. Icon painting is by famous artist M. Nesterov. The work on the decorative design was not completed because of the revolutionary events of 1917.

Museums 

The Sumy Regional Art Museum was opened in 1920. It started with nationalized private collections of the town and district. Paintings of Taras Shevchenko, Vladimir Borovikovsky, I. Shyskin, Arkhip Kuindzhi and Tetyana Yablonska are on display, including a Dutch landscape by a painter of Jan van Goyen's circle. Today the museum contains unique paintings and works of applied art. The building of the early 20th century originally belonged to the State Bank.

The Museum of Local Lore was opened in 1920. In the years of fascist occupation, the most important items of its collections were lost. Today it contains unique collections covering archeology and the natural history of the Sumy region. It is located in the building of the 19th century which originally was the seat of the district government. In 1905 it was given to the printing house and publishing house of the first Sumy newspapers. In different years the building was visited by A. Kuprin and V. Korolenko, the famous Russian writers.

The Chekhov Museum, located on Chekhov street is an architectural complex representing Lintvarev's country estate of the 18th and 19th centuries. In 1888 and 1889 a great writer and dramatist Anton Chekhov was dreaming to settle in Luka forever but his dream did not come true. “Abbacia and the Adriatic Sea are wonderful, but Luka and Psiol are better” – he wrote in his letter from Italy to his friends in Sumy in 1894. This is also a place where Anton Chekhov's brother, Nikolai Chekhov, died in 1889.

The Museum of Banking history in the Sumy oblast and the History of Ukrainian Money was founded in 2006 to commemorate the 10th anniversary of the Ukrainian Academy of Banking based on a unique collection of Ukrainian bonds – the paper money out of circulation, which were given to the academy by the National Bank of Ukraine. The exposition of the bonds is arranged in the thematic-chronological order - from the first appearance of money to the present day. In addition to the numerous historical documents, photographs, metal money (coins, souvenir bars), and commemorative medals of the National Bank of Ukraine, there is an exhibition presenting technical appliances used in the banking industry in the late 20th century.

Notable people 
 
 

Aleksey Alchevsky (1835–1901), industrialist and philanthropist, founded the city of Alchevsk
Hanna Bezliudna (born 1972) is a Ukrainian media manager, producer and public figure.
Karl Burman (1882–1965), an Estonian architect and painter.
Mykola Hrunskyi (early 20th C.), a senior researcher specializing in studying of the Russian language at the Linguistic Institute of the National Academy of Sciences of Ukraine
Dmytro Kuleba (born 1981) a politician and diplomat; currently Minister of Foreign Affairs. 
Anatoliy Mokrenko (1933–2020) a Ukrainian operatic baritone
Viktoria Orel (born 1991) a model, beauty pageant titleholder and Miss Ukraine Earth, 2015
Yekaterina Peshkova (1887–1965), a Soviet human rights activist and first wife of Maxim Gorky.
Pyotr Voevodin (1884–1964) was a Russian revolutionary, Soviet politician and film producer.

Sport 
Kazimierz Gzowski (1901–1986) a Polish cavalry officer and horse rider, team silver medallist at the 1928 Summer Olympics.
Volodymyr Holubnychy (born 1936), race-walker, 4-time Olympic medallist
Oleh Husiev (born 1983), a footballer with 319 club caps and 98 for Ukraine
Volodymyr Romanenko (born 1985) football midfielder with over 330 club caps
Kateryna Samson (born 1988) is a Ukrainian football goalkeeper with 21 caps for Ukraine women
Serhiy Strashnenko (born 1953) a Soviet former football goalkeeper with over 400 club caps

Sports 

The field hockey club MSC Sumchanka has won the Ukrainian championship 12 times and was the European champion once.

Sumy is home to the Ukrainian First League football team FC Alians and Ukrainian Second League football team FC Sumy.

The Ukrainian Premier League football club FC Kharkiv were leasing the city's state-of-the-art Yuvileiny Stadium.

The Yuvileiny Stadium, formerly known as Spartak, was planned to be renovated just before dissolution of the Soviet Union and in 1989 was demolished to be built anew. It was not until 1998 that the actual construction was resumed and finally finished in 2001.

Twin towns – sister cities

Sumy is twinned with:

 Celle, Germany (1990)
 Gorzów Wielkopolski, Poland (2006)
 Kutaisi, Georgia (2018)
 Lublin, Poland (2002)
 Vratsa, Bulgaria (1966)
 Xinxiang, China (2019)
 Zhuji, China (2019)

Other forms of cooperation
 Banská Bystrica, Slovakia (2016)
 Wohlen, Switzerland (2015)

References
Notes

External links

 City of Sumy travel guide 
 Independent regional Web-portal - news, features, entertainment & tourism info
 Sumy administration
 Sumy travel guide 
 Medical institute of Sumy State University
 The Sumian Historical Web-Society
 Regional Web-portal, open business-directory of the city
 Portal Sumy - news, weather, calendar, map, ad
 City centre Web-cam 

 
Cities in Sumy Oblast
Sumsky Uyezd
Populated places established in 1652
Cities of regional significance in Ukraine
1652 establishments in Russia
Oblast centers in Ukraine
Cities and towns built in the Sloboda Ukraine